In enzymology, an endoglycosylceramidase is an enzyme that catalyzes the chemical reaction

oligoglycosylglucosylceramide + H2O  ceramide + oligoglycosylglucose

Thus, the two substrates of this enzyme are oligoglycosylglucosylceramide and H2O, whereas its two products are ceramide and oligoglycosylglucose.

This enzyme belongs to the family of hydrolases, specifically those glycosidases that hydrolyse O- and S-glycosyl compounds.  The systematic name of this enzyme class is oligoglycosylglucosylceramide glycohydrolase. Other names in common use include endoglycoceramidase, EGCase, and glycosyl-N-acetyl-sphingosine 1,1-beta-D-glucanohydrolase.

Structural studies

References

 

EC 3.2.1
Enzymes of known structure